Paul Duke STEM High School (PDS HS) is a senior high school located on Peachtree Industrial Boulevard in the Peachtree Corners/Norcross area in Georgia. It is a part of Gwinnett County Public Schools (GCPS). The school's mascot is the TrailBlazers.

History

Paul Duke, which opened in 2018 with grades 9–11, with 650 prospective students as of August 2018, has a STEM focus. Built for $38 million, it relieved Norcross High School; as of 2018 it only takes students in the Norcross High attendance zone including Peachtree Corners, and therefore is not yet a magnet school.

The  capacity school, the smallest built in the period 2008–2018, has fine arts, music, and gymnasium spaces, but will not have its own non-intramural sports team facilities. Of the schools built circa 2008-2018 it had the highest per-square foot costs. The school is named after Paul A. Duke who founded Peachtree Corners.

References

External links
 Paul Duke STEM High School

Public high schools in Georgia (U.S. state)
Schools in Gwinnett County, Georgia
2018 establishments in Georgia (U.S. state)
Educational institutions established in 2018